Tilly Greene is an American romantic fiction author.

Biography
Born in Southern California, Greene eventually moved to North Yorkshire in England to further her education, and now resides on the New Jersey.

Bibliography

Paperback
 Extreme Speed, Total Control, Whiskey Creek Press Torrid - 2006
 Zandia, Samhain Publishing - 2007
 Highland Heat, Ellora's Cave - 2009

eBook
 Come, Sweet Creature, Whiskey Creek Press Torrid - 2006
 Extreme Speed, Total Control, Whiskey Creek Press Torrid - 2006
 New Beginnings: Carpe Diem, Samhain Publishing - 2006
 An Invitation to the World: Russia and New Zealand, Whiskey Creek Press Torrid - 2006
 An Invitation to the World 2: China and India, Whiskey Creek Press Torrid - 2007
 Zandia, Samhain Publishing - 2007
 Ride 'em, Ellora's Cave - 2008
 Highland Heat, Ellora's Cave - 2009
 An Invitation to the World: Russia, New Zealand, China and India, Best of Torrid Teasers Vol 2, Whiskey Creek Press Torrid - 2010
 Call Me Lucifer, Whiskey Creek Press Torrid – 2010
 My Angel, Whiskey Creek Press Torrid – 2010
 Missing in Paradise, Ellora's Cave - 2011
 Konnichiwa Cowboy, Tilly Greene - 2011
 Good, Bad and Kinky, Whiskey Creek Press Torrid – 2011
 The Keeper, Tilly Greene - 2012
 Special Delivery, Tilly Greene - 2012
 Leather Bride, Ellora's Cave - 2012
 Taste for Blood, Tilly Greene - 2012
 Pleasured in New York City, Tilly Greene - 2012
 Hephaestus Lays Down the Law, Tilly Greene - 2013
 Together Again, Tilly Greene - 2013

For the benefit of others
 Poor Man Taco Recipe, The Write Ingredients, Samhain Publishing – 2007 – raises funds for the continued support of America's Troops.
 Drive-In, Coming Together: Under Fire, Coming Together - 2007 - all proceeds to benefit 2007 San Diego wildfire victims
 And She Scores!, All Romance - 2010 - all proceeds to the American Heart Association
 Coming Together: Against H8, keepsake book, Coming Together - 2010 - all proceeds to the NOH8 Campaign

Professional associations 
 Romance Writers of America
 Erotic Authors Association

External links 
 Tilly Greene's Official Website
 Hot Thoughts Blog
 Monthly Scorcher - Yahoo
 Monthly Scorcher - Google

Year of birth missing (living people)
Living people
21st-century American novelists
American erotica writers
American romantic fiction writers
BDSM writers
Writers from California
American women novelists
Women romantic fiction writers
21st-century American women writers
Women erotica writers